This battle took place on 17 August 1712 south of Rügen, in the Baltic Sea, during the Great Northern War. The action was a victory for Denmark, commanded by Hannibal Sehested, over Sweden, commanded by Henck.

Ships involved
The name of the ship is followed by the number of guns carried.

Denmark
Kongens Jagt Krone 24
Ark Noa 16
Ebenetzer 15
Helleflynder 14
Christianso 26
Svenske Sophia 20
Gravenstein 14
Phoenix 12
Hecla 10 (bomb)
1 crayer (kreiert, krejert)
5 barges
3 fireships

Sweden
Stralsund 30
Anklam 30
St Thomas 30
St Johannes 30
Witduve 22
Jomfru 14
Sjökane I 8
Sjökane II 8
? 6 (pram)
? 6 (galley)
? (bomb)
11 transports

References

Conflicts in 1712
1712
1712 in Denmark
Military history of the Baltic Sea

de:Seegefechte im Greifswalder Bodden (1712)
no:Slaget i Westtief